Alex Jay Scott (born 21 August 2003) is a professional footballer who plays as a midfielder for Bristol City. Born in Guernsey, he represents England at youth level.

Club career
Scott signed for Isthmian League side Guernsey on turning 16 having previously trained with the youth teams of Southampton and AFC Bournemouth, he made his debut for the Green Lions against Phoenix Sports on 31 August 2019 becoming the youngest ever Guernsey player. Scott made 15 appearances for Guernsey before his transfer in January 2020.

In December 2019, Scott signed a pre-contract agreement with Championship side Bristol City. Having initially linked up with the club's academy, Scott signed his first professional contract with Bristol City in March 2021. Scott made his professional debut with Bristol City as a starter in a 1–1 Championship draw to Blackpool on 7 August 2021. After missing a crucial chance earlier on in the game against Nottingham Forest, Scott soon went on to get his first career goal for the Robins, putting them 1–0 up on the 19th of October 2021 at the 39th minute mark, coming off in the 78th minute in a game that ended 2–1 to Nottingham Forest.

Scott's impressive performances across the 2022–23 season did not go unnoticed with manager Nigel Pearson valuing him at over £25 million amid interest from a number of Premier League clubs. He was awarded the EFL Young Player of the Month award for February 2023 having played a starring role in Bristol City's midfield as they climbed the table. Following Bristol City's defeat against Manchester City in the FA Cup on 28 February 2023, Scott was described by Pep Guardiola as an "unbelievable player", and by Jack Grealish as a "top, top talent".

International career
Scott received his first call-up to the England national under-18 football team side in March 2021. On 29 March 2021, Scott made his debut as a second-half substitute in England's 2–0 win against Wales.

On 2 September 2021, Scott made his debut for the England U19s during a 2–0 victory over Italy U19s at St. George's Park.

On 17 June 2022, Scott was included in the England U19 squad for the 2022 UEFA European Under-19 Championship. He came off the bench during the semi-final against Italy to score an equalizer with his first touch of the game. Scott started in the final as England won the tournament with a 3-1 extra time victory over Israel on 1 July 2022.

On 21 September 2022, Scott made his England U20 debut during a 3-0 victory over Chile at the Pinatar Arena.

Career statistics

Honours
England U19s

 UEFA European Under-19 Championship: 2022
 Rising Star Award - 2022 CI Sports Awards.

Individual
EFL Young Player of the Month: February 2023

References

External links
 
 BCFC Profile

2003 births
Living people
English footballers
England youth international footballers
Guernsey footballers
Association football midfielders
Guernsey F.C. players
Bristol City F.C. players
Southern Football League players
English Football League players